The Asian section of the 2026 FIFA World Cup qualification will act as qualifiers for the 2026 FIFA World Cup to be held in Canada, the United States and Mexico for national teams who are members of the Asian Football Confederation (AFC). A total of  slots (8 direct slots and 1 inter-confederation play-off slot) in the final tournament are available for AFC teams.

The qualification process involves five rounds; the first two double as the qualification for the 2027 AFC Asian Cup.

Format
The qualification structure was revamped to fit the eight-team slot and it is as follows:
First round: 22 teams (ranked 26–47) will play home-and-away over two legs. The eleven winners advance to the second round.
Second round: 36 teams (ranked 1–25 and eleven first-round winners) are divided into nine groups of four teams. The teams would play against each other on a home-and-away basis. The nine group winners and group runners-up advance to the third round and automatically qualify to the AFC Asian Cup. 
Third round: 18 teams which advance from the second round are divided into three groups of six teams. The teams would play against each other on a home-and-away basis. The top two teams of each group qualify directly for the FIFA World Cup, the third and fourth-placed teams advance to the fourth round.
Fourth round: Six third and fourth-placed teams from the third round are divided into two groups of three teams each. The teams would play against each other once in a neutral venue. The winners of each group qualify for the World Cup, and the runners-up of each group advance to the fifth round.
Fifth round: The group runners-up in the fourth round will compete in a play-off tie to determine the Asian representation at the inter-confederation play-offs. The format of the play-off tie is unknown.

Entrants
All 46 AFC-affiliated nations also affiliated to FIFA are eligible for qualification for the 2026 FIFA World Cup. Northern Mariana Islands – who are AFC-affiliated but not FIFA-affiliated – can, at the furthest, play the second round in order to qualify for the 2027 AFC Asian Cup. The FIFA World Rankings of the AFC nations at the time of the draw will be used to determine which nations will compete in the first round. For seeding in the second round and third round draws, the most recent FIFA Rankings prior to these draws will be used.

According to the joint format of the World Cup and Asian Cup qualifiers, Saudi Arabia (as the host nation of the 2027 Asian Cup) will also enter the second round of the qualifiers.

Schedule
The schedule of the competition is expected to be as follows, according to the FIFA International Match Calendar.

First round

Second round

Group A

Group B

Group C

Group D

Group E

Group F

Group G

Group H

Group I

Third round

Group A

Group B

Group C

Fourth round

Group A

Group B

Fifth round

The two second-placed teams in each group from the fourth round played against each other to determine which team advanced to the inter-confederation play-offs.

Inter-confederation play-off

See also
 2027 AFC Asian Cup qualification

Notes

References

External links

FIFA.com
FIFA World Cup, The-AFC.com

 
Afc
FIFA World Cup qualification (AFC)
2023 in Asian football
2024 in Asian football
2025 in Asian football